Archive II is a three disc compilation of live and demo material by Japanese band, Boris. Volume 4 was recorded on 2003/5/15 in Tokyo and only contains songs from Heavy Rocks and Akuma no Uta, while volume 5 was recorded on 2006/5/31 in New York City and contains songs from Pink, Akuma no Uta, Dronevil, and Sound Track from Film "Mabuta no Ura".

Track listing

References

Boris (band) live albums
Live album series
2013 live albums
2000s live albums
2013 compilation albums